The 13th Coast Regiment, New Zealand Artillery was a coastal artillery regiment of the New Zealand Military Forces. It was formed in May 1943 from the coastal defence batteries based in the lower South Island, which were formerly part of 11th Coast Regiment. The regiment consisted of:
82 Battery (Taiaroa Head: one 6" EOC gun; Rerewahine: two 6" Mk VII guns; Tomahawk Beach: two 6" Mk VII guns; Harrington Point: two twin 6-pounder guns and two 6-pounder guns)
141 Battery (Oamaru: one 5" Mk VIII gun)
142 Battery (Bluff: 6" Mk VII gun)

The 13th Coast Regiment was disbanded in December 1943 and the batteries returned to the 11th Coast Regiment.

Affiliations
 — Royal Artillery
 — Royal Canadian Artillery
 — Royal Australian Artillery

References

Artillery regiments of New Zealand
Military units and formations established in 1943
Military units and formations disestablished in 1943